This is the list of Yugoslav submissions for  the Academy Award for Best International Feature Film category. The award is handed out annually by the United States Academy of Motion Picture Arts and Sciences to a feature-length motion picture produced outside the United States that contains primarily non-English dialogue. It was not created until the 1956 Academy Awards, in which a competitive Academy Award of Merit, known as the Best Foreign Language Film Award, was created for non-English speaking films, and has been given annually since.

Submissions

See also 

 List of Bosnian submissions for the Academy Award for Best International Feature Film
 List of Croatian submissions for the Academy Award for Best International Feature Film
 List of Kosovan submissions for the Academy Award for Best International Feature Film
 List of Montenegrin submissions for the Academy Award for Best International Feature Film
 List of North Macedonian submissions for the Academy Award for Best International Feature Film
 List of Serbian submissions for the Academy Award for Best International Feature Film
 List of Slovenian submissions for the Academy Award for Best International Feature Film

Notes

References

Yugoslavia